Cúmplices de um Resgate (English. Friends to the Rescue) is a Brazilian teen telenovela created by Rosy Ocampo and written by Íris Abravanel, originally broadcast on SBT from August 2015 to December 2016. It is the Brazilian remake of the Mexican telenovela Cómplices al rescate produced by Televisa in 2002.

Production 
In August 2014, the call was initiated for the cast and testing began in September. Larissa Manoela, already starring Patrulha Salvadora at the time, was called to play the twin protagonists without need to do the tests. The cast was announced in January 2015, when there was an improvement workshop for the characters, and filming began on March 23. Some scenes and music videos were filmed in 4K resolution, technology hitherto unheard of in the SBT's dramaturgy.

Supposedly, Mexican sites said Gabriela Spanic and SBT were making an agreement so she could take a part in the telenovela, but the network has denied such things. In late June, an accident suffered by Larissa Manoela, who plays the protagonists pulled her away temporarily from filming and delayed the program's debut date. The actress fell from a horse in Atibaia during filming and had to stay a few weeks off.

On November 10, 2015, SBT announced the departure of actress Duda Wendling, who played Doris, because her mother didn't allow the renewal of her contract. Actress Sophia Valverde, who played Maria in Chiquititas, replaced her.

Plot 
Two twin sisters who were separated after birth are reunited after twelve years. Luna (Isabela Palhano), one of the twins, is sweet, gentle, very talented for music and has a lovely voice. She lives a happy life in "Village of Dreams:, where she lives with her grandmother Nina (Mira Haar), her aunt Helena (Thays Gorga) and her mother Rebecca (Juliana Baroni), who loves and cares for her daughter as Luna never met her father. Rebecca is the biological mother of two girls, but she never knew she had. Luna is very beloved in the village, and is member of a band called "Luna e Seus Amigos" (Luna & Her Friends). Other members are her aunt Helena, Pedro (Elam Lima), Mateus (Lipe Volpato) and his younger sister Doris (Sophia Valverde) and Teo (Fhelipe Gomes), a blind yet smart boy. They are accompanied by Manteiguinha, Teo's guide dog and Mateus and Doris' mouse, Tuntum. The two animals "talk" to each other, following the children of the village.

Isadora(Isabela Palhano) was separated from Luna at birth and lives a rich life, surrounded by employees and many perks, but she has no friends. She lives in conflict with her "mother" Regina (Maria Pinna), who had to steal her when she was born with the help of her brother Geraldo (Nando Pradho) since she can't have children of her own. Orlando (Alexandre Barros), Isadora's father, works hard but always has time for his daughter and makes all her wishes. Isadora is also beloved by Marina (Tânia Bondezan), her nanny and the housekeeper. She dreams of being a singer, but she has no such talent.

A children's group is about to be formed by the label "Do-Re-Music", where Isadora works with André (Felipe Cavalcanti) and the Vaz siblings: Joaquim (John William), Júlia (Bia Jordan) and Felipe (Kevin Vechiatto). Isadora does anything to get signed and Regina becomes her business agent, faking everything so that no one outside of the city ever finds out that Isadora exists, because it would be a huge problem to her if the girl becomes famous. Things change when Marina takes Isadora to a music competition where Luna's band also participates. Isadora sees the resemblance between them both, then proposes a switch.

Everything goes wrong. Luna, pretending to be Isadora, can not sing at the audition and Isadora, pretending to be Luna, makes everyone suspicious. The two decide to switch places again. The test works, but Regina and Geraldo bring in another girl to take Isadora down and kick her out of the band. The girl is Priscila (Giovanna Chaves), Safira's daughter (Dani Moreno). Priscilla sings and the two fight to be the vocalist. Meanwhile, after examination, Orlando discovers he has a serious illness and will die.

Orlando has a heart attack and dies. Before dying, he reveals the secret code of the safe box to Isadora, arranges his will and leaves all his inheritance to her, but as Isa is a minor, the money is under Marina's protection, leaving Regina furious. After that, Geraldo watches a DVD of Luna & Her Friends and realizes the similarity between the girls and then notices that Luna was the one singing on Isadora's audition. He tells this to Regina, who is furious to learn that Luna and Isadora have met. She and Geraldo decide to kidnap Luna and send Isadora away so Luna can usurp Isadora as place in the band and make money for Regina and Geraldo with her voice, since Orlando left nothing to Regina. Marina sees Isadora (pretending to be Luna) in the village. So Isadora tells that they are twins and they actually switched places for Luna to sing in her place. Regina tells Geraldo that Isadora can learn more than they want her to, so she tells a story to Isadora that Rebeca abandoned her and Regina saved her. Geraldo sends his henchmen to kidnap Luna. Regina Isadora hostage at the back of the mansion, who manages to escape and ask for help to the Vaz siblings. They learn about the secret and help Isadora to rescue Luna, while Rebecca is dedicated to find her missing daughter.

Broadcast 
The first chapter aired on August 3, 2015 at the 9 pm timeslot, after the final chapter of Chiquititas and before the Carrossel reprise. After the end of Chiquititas, the program started airing from 8:30 pm. On Saturday, August 15, at 22:30 pm, SBT aired a compact of the first 10 chapters.

The telenovela aired from Monday to Friday, with the indicative rating of "Livre para todos os públicos" (Free for all audiences). The author Iris Abravanel noted that the telenovela deals with more adult themes than previous programs, but the content is adapted to the indicative classification: "The program has a more adult cast and addresses issues a little more delicate than the previous plots, but we take care to maintain the lightness."

Cast

Main cast 

Animais
Voz	Personagem
Robson Kumode	Tuntum
Diego Lima	Manteiguinha
Herbert Richers Jr.	Bartolomeu
N/A	Beijoca
Renata Calmon	Poodle
|-

|- 
| Robson Kumode || Tuntum
|-
| Diego Lima || Manteiguinha
|-
| Herbert Richers Jr. || Bartolomeu
|-
|  || Beijoca
|-
| Renata Calmon || Poodle 
|-
|}
Dourado
Gato Preto
Josefina

Guest starring

Gallery

Awards and nominations

See also 
 Cómplices al rescate - telenovela produced by Televisa in 2002

References 
Isabela Palhano

External links 
  

2015 telenovelas
Brazilian telenovelas
2015 Brazilian television series debuts
2016 Brazilian television series endings
Sistema Brasileiro de Televisão telenovelas
Children's telenovelas
Teen telenovelas
Television series about sisters
Television series about teenagers
Brazilian television series based on Mexican television series
Portuguese-language telenovelas